Mailson Lima Duarte Lopes (born 29 May 1994) is a professional footballer who plays as a winger for Ararat-Armenia. Born in the Netherlands, he has made one appearance for the Cape Verde national team.

Club career
Mailson made his Eerste Divisie debut for Fortuna Sittard on 28 April 2017 in a game against RKC Waalwijk.

In January 2018, after a brief spell with Dordrecht where he played 16 league matches and scored five goals, Mailson signed a one-and-a-half-year contract with the option of another two years with Romanian team Viitorul Constanța.

On 26 February 2019, Lima signed with FC Ararat-Armenia. After leaving Ararat-Armenia for Dibba Al-Hisn in January 2021, Lima returned to Ararat-Armenia on 6 July 2021.

International career
Lima made his professional debut for the Cape Verde national football team in a friendly 3-2 win over Algeria on 1 June 2018.

Personal life
He is the older brother of Ronaldo Lima Duarte Lopes.

Career statistics

Club

International

Honours
Viitorul Constanța
Cupa României: 2018–19

Ararat-Armenia
 Armenian Premier League: 2018–19, 2019–20
 Armenian Supercup: 2019

References

External links

1994 births
Living people
Footballers from The Hague
Cape Verdean footballers
Cape Verde international footballers
Dutch footballers
Dutch sportspeople of Cape Verdean descent
Association football wingers
ADO Den Haag players
Eerste Divisie players
Fortuna Sittard players
FC Dordrecht players
Liga I players
FC Viitorul Constanța players
Armenian Premier League players
FC Ararat-Armenia players
Dibba Al-Hisn Sports Club players
UAE First Division League players
Dutch expatriate footballers
Cape Verdean expatriate footballers
Expatriate footballers in Romania
Expatriate footballers in Armenia
Cape Verdean expatriate sportspeople in Romania
Dutch expatriate sportspeople in Romania
Expatriate footballers in the United Arab Emirates
Cape Verdean expatriate sportspeople in the United Arab Emirates
Dutch expatriate sportspeople in the United Arab Emirates